Sinéad Burke (born 1990) is an Irish writer, academic and disability activist, popular for her TED talk 'Why design should include everyone'. She is the Director of consulting organisation 'Tilting the Lens', working to raise the baseline standards in accessibility, to design an equitable and accessible world. Since 2019, she has been a member of the Irish Council of State.

Sinéad released her first book ‘Break the Mould’ in October 2020. It was awarded the Specsavers Children’s Book of the Year award at the An Post Irish Book Awards. Sinéad appeared on the cover of the 'Forces for Change' issue of British Vogue, guest-edited by the Duchess of Sussex. She also appeared on the cover of The Business of Fashion in May 2018 alongside Kim Kardashian with an interview as part of 'The Age of Influence' series.

Education 

Burke trained as a primary school teacher, graduating from Marino Institute of Education at the top of her class and winning the Vere Foster medal and holds a Masters in Broadcast Production for TV and Radio from IADT.

Fashion and design activism 
As a 16-year old, Burke often felt excluded from fashion conversations and experiences due to her limited choices available to her as someone with achondroplasia, so she started blogging to highlight the exclusive nature of the fashion industry. "People didn’t take me seriously because of my physical aesthetic, so I started blogging… and collaborating with the [fashion] industry".

Burke was invited to attend the White House for an event titled 'Design for all' where the Obama administration highlighted the intersection of fashion and disability. Burke actively campaigns to highlight the importance of inclusive design in all areas of life due to the practical challenges she faces in living and moving in a world that was not designed for people with disabilities. "Design is an enormous privilege, but it is a bigger responsibility".

In 2012, Burke as Miss Minnie Mélange won the final Alternative Miss Ireland competition.

In 2019, Burke became the first little person to attend the Met Gala.

She was one of 15 women selected to appear on the cover of the September 2019 issue of British Vogue, by guest editor Meghan, Duchess of Sussex.

Burke is an ambassador for the Irish Society for the Prevention of Cruelty to Children and the Irish Girl Guides. On 4 April 2019 Michael D. Higgins, the President of Ireland, appointed her to his Council of State.

Burke was a part of the Finding Power collection by Joe Caslin displayed in the National Gallery of Ireland.

Burke appeared on the long-running BBC Radio 4 programme Desert Island Discs (hosted by Lauren Laverne) on Sunday 17 May 2020. Her luxury item was the special necklace that each female member of her immediate family has.

Podcast 
In October 2019, Burke released As Me with Sinéad, a podcast series from the Lemonada Media network focused on empathy, identity, and perception through in-depth interviews. Burke serves as host of the show, with Pod Save the People’s Jessica Cordova Kramer as executive producer.

Guests of As Me have included Victoria Beckham, Jamie Lee Curtis, Jameela Jamil, Hozier, Akilah Hughes, Riz Ahmed, Mara Wilson, Radhika Jones, Tig Notaro, Dan Levy, and Florence Welch. Each guest was asked to elaborate on what it’s like to be them, with the stated intent of challenging biases and deepening humanity.

Break The Mould 
On 28 May 2020, Burke announced her new children's book, Break The Mould, which would contain lessons for adults as well as children about being different. Burke wrote while in lockdown during the COVID-19 pandemic.

Break The Mould was released on 15 October, where pre-order sales had determined it as a best-seller.

In November 2020, Break The Mould was announced as the winner of the 'Specsavers Children’s Book of the Year – Senior' category at the An Post Irish Book Awards 2020.

Recognition
She was recognized as one of the BBC's 100 women of 2019.

References 

1990 births
Irish women activists
Irish fashion designers
Irish women's rights activists
21st-century Irish women writers
Irish disability rights activists
Living people
Presidential appointees to the Council of State (Ireland)
People with dwarfism
BBC 100 Women
Irish women fashion designers
Alumni of Marino Institute of Education